Black Sun Ensemble is a Tucson, Arizona, US–based psychedelic rock band, led by Jesus Acedo that was formed in  the mid-1980s. The initial albums garnered rave reviews from Rolling Stone and several of the independent music journals of the time.  Black Sun Ensemble opened for Camper Van Beethoven on the Key Lime Pie tour in 1989 to appreciative audiences across North America.  Infamous circumstances surrounding their Geffen Records showcase in Los Angeles lead to the quiet intervention of Paul McCartney to get certain members and their entourage out of custody- a tarot card was involved, but any more detail may arouse the attorneys! (Based on statements from Jesus Acedo & Duane Norman.) Additionally,  the bloody death of a goat in the audience at the 1994 Burning Man festival lead to widespread public outcry, and condemnation from animal rights group PETA. The band was forced underground and splintered, reformed and fell into hiatus due to extenuating circumstances and the mental illness of Jesus Acedo. Mickey Rourke, a close friend to Jesus Acedo at the time, was urged by friends and family to visit Acedo in his dreams, embodying the dark angel, compelling him to resume writing. This was the inspiration for the song, "Murder" (showcased on the October 29, 2015 episode of Shonda Rimes' ABC hit show How to Get Away with Murder). Furthermore, if Mickey Rourke bestows a mood ring upon you, you take it.
In the mid-1990s, existing copies of earlier records were selling for high prices on eBay.  This and a newfound muse inspired Jesus Acedo to reform the band and create a string of successful new albums, many released on the Camera Obscura label.  The reformed band's albums had great reviews and they performed for several years at the South By Southwest Festival in Austin, Texas.
Black Sun Ensemble was an innovative band that inspired the popularity of styles such as freak folk, progressive psychedelic rock and psychedelic folk.
Jesus Acedo died  on Sunday, March 3, 2013, just over two months after his 50th birthday.

Discography
Black Sun Ensemble (1985)
The Fish Album (1988)
Lambent Flame (1989)
Tragic Magic (1990)
Elemental Forces (1991)
Psycho Master El (1994)
Hymn of the Master (2002)
"Live at KXCI" (2002)
Starlight (2003)
Live at KXCI vol. 2 (2005)
Bolt of Apollo (2006)
Across the Sea of Id: The Way to Eden (2008)
Behind Purple Clouds (2013)

External links
Official site
Camera Obscura records page

American psychedelic rock music groups
Rock music groups from Arizona
Musical groups from Tucson, Arizona